Kuasha (The fog) is a Bengali thriller film directed by Premendra Mitra based on his own novel. This movie was released in the banner of Mahabharati Limited on 19 August 1949.

Plot

Cast
 Dhiraj Bhattacharya
 Nripati Chattopadhyay
 Kanu Banerjee
 Gurudas Banerjee
 Chhaya Devi
 Nabadwip Haldar
 Rajlakhsmi Devi
 Shisir Batabyal
Joynarayan Mukherjee
Shipra Mitra
Ganesh Chandra Goswami
Dhiraj Das

References

External links
 

Indian detective films
1949 films
Bengali-language Indian films
Indian mystery thriller films
1940s Bengali-language films
Films directed by Premendra Mitra
1940s mystery thriller films
Indian black-and-white films
Films based on Indian novels